The 2019 Amex-Istanbul Challenger was a professional tennis tournament played on hard courts. It was the 32nd edition of the tournament which was part of the 2019 ATP Challenger Tour. It took place in Istanbul, Turkey between 9 and 15 September 2019.

Singles main-draw entrants

Seeds

 1 Rankings are as of 26 August 2019.

Other entrants
The following players received wildcards into the singles main draw: 
  Baran Cengiz
  Marsel İlhan
  Holger Vitus Nødskov Rune
  Kirill Saplin
  Mert Naci Türker

The following players received entry into the singles main draw as alternates:
  Sander Arends
  Victor Vlad Cornea
  Mikhail Elgin
  Marek Gengel
  Burak Can Yılmaz

Champions

Singles

 Ugo Humbert def.  Denis Istomin 6–2, 6–2.

Doubles

 Andrey Golubev /  Aleksandr Nedovyesov def.  Marek Gengel /  Lukáš Rosol Walkover.

References

2019 ATP Challenger Tour
2019
2019 in Turkish tennis
September 2019 sports events in Turkey